Colonial Park is an unincorporated community and census-designated place (CDP) in Lower Paxton Township, Pennsylvania, United States. The population was 13,229 at the 2010 census. It is part of the Harrisburg–Carlisle Metropolitan Statistical Area. It uses the Harrisburg ZIP code of 17109 and hosts a great deal of the area's retail activity, including the Colonial Park Mall.

Geography
Colonial Park is located in the southwestern quadrant of Lower Paxton Township at  (40.298789, -76.809067). It is bordered to the northeast by Paxtonia and to the west by Progress. Interstate 83 forms the western boundary of the CDP. U.S. Route 22 (Jonestown Road) is the main highway through Colonial Park, leading west  to downtown Harrisburg and east  to Fredericksburg.

Demographics

As of the 2010 United States Census, there were 13,229 people living in the CDP. The racial makeup of the CDP was 69.7% White, 14.9% Black, 0.1% Native American, 4.5% Asian, 0.1% Pacific Islander, 0.1% from some other race and 2.8% from two or more races. 7.8% were Hispanic or Latino of any race.

As of the census of 2000, there were 13,259 people, 6,134 households, and 3,477 families living in the CDP. The population density was 2,825.6 people per square mile (1,091.5/km). There were 6,484 housing units at an average density of 1,381.8 per square mile (533.8/km). The racial makeup of the CDP was 83.19% White, 9.75% African American, 0.08% Native American, 3.84% Asian, 0.02% Pacific Islander, 1.52% from other races, and 1.61% from two or more races. Hispanic or Latino of any race were 3.12% of the population.

There were 6,134 households, out of which 22.1% had children under the age of 18 living with them, 43.0% were married couples living together, 10.1% had a female householder with no husband present, and 43.3% were non-families. 36.1% of all households were made up of individuals, and 11.5% had someone living alone who was 65 years of age or older. The average household size was 2.12 and the average family size was 2.78.

In the CDP, the population was spread out, with 18.8% under the age of 18, 9.3% from 18 to 24, 31.4% from 25 to 44, 21.9% from 45 to 64, and 18.5% who were 65 years of age or older. The median age was 39 years. For every 100 females, there were 91.8 males. For every 100 females age 18 and over, there were 87.9 males.

The median income for a household in the CDP was $40,562, and the median income for a family was $49,676. Males had a median income of $35,749 versus $28,631 for females. The per capita income for the CDP was $22,436. About 4.7% of families and 6.2% of the population were below the poverty line, including 7.9% of those under age 18 and 4.8% of those age 65 or over.

See also
Lower Paxton Township, Pennsylvania

References

Harrisburg–Carlisle metropolitan statistical area
Census-designated places in Dauphin County, Pennsylvania
Census-designated places in Pennsylvania